Goodbee is an unincorporated community in Saint Tammany Parish, Louisiana, United States, at the intersection of U.S. Route 190 and Louisiana Highway 1077, west of Covington. Goodbee has a signed exit on Interstate 12 to its south, at its interchange with LA 1077.

Northwest of Goodbee is the start of P-Kaw-Shun Creek, the major contributory to Sims Creek. The stream flows in a generally southwestward direction to join the Tangipahoa River south of Robert in Tangipahoa Parish.

Seven miles west of Goodbee, near Robert, is a major distribution center for Walmart Stores.

Closer to Goodbee, at the boundary between Saint Tammany and Tangipahoa Parishes, is the Florida Parishes Juvenile Detention Center, a correctional institution for youths.

Notes

Unincorporated communities in St. Tammany Parish, Louisiana
Unincorporated communities in Louisiana
Unincorporated communities in New Orleans metropolitan area